Ski Land is a lift-served ski and snowboard area at Cleary Summit on the Steese Highway, 20 miles north of Fairbanks, Alaska. The area has one chairlift, North America's most-northern; it is 3882 feet long and serves 1027 feet of vertical rise. As of 2018, the area also has one magic carpet. Road access and the lodge are on a ridge at an elevation of 2435 feet, overlooking a wooded, north-facing bowl. The location is one of the best viewing spots in the winter for the northern lights and looks over the Poker Flat Research Station and Rocket Range.

The ski season typically runs from November into late April, on weekends only. Tree and glade skiing opportunities abound. On at least one occasion, slopes were re-opened in May after a heavy snowfall. The slopes are patrolled by the National Ski Patrol.

During the summer Ski Land operates an ATV Tour with Polaris RZR's and ACE's. The tours utilize the historic Fairbanks-Circle Trail and its off-shoots.

History
From 1962 until 1990, a pair of rope tows (upper and lower) served 900 vertical feet total and were generally operated by volunteers. From 1990 to 2014 the Birdsall family leased the resort, installing a double chairlift originally installed at the Silver Star Mountain Resort in British Columbia, to replace the ropes, and ran the hill as a family business. In the fall of 2017, a new 360' long Sun Kid Wunder Carpet was installed; it opened in January 2018.

In 2015 the area was acquired by Fairbanks doctors Andrew and Jacqueline Cox, who now operate it as a ski area and Aurora viewing lodge. Extensive updates to the lodges, trails, lift, maintenance equipment and other facilities have been made. Over the next 10 years, more expansions including lodging, snowmaking, trail expansion, a new lodge, and new lifts are in the master development plan for the ski area.

In 2014, Ski Land hosted the Alpine Skiing event of the Arctic Winter Games. Timing boxes from this event can still be found on the mountain.

In 2016, Ski Land started a partnership with University of Alaska Fairbanks to host the Hulbert Nanook Terrain Park. In addition, all full-time UAF students are eligible to receive a free season pass if certain requirements are met.

In the summer of 2018, Ski Land began offering ATV tours through the wilderness of Alaska along the Circle-Fairbanks Historic Trail.

Facilities
Ski Land hosts two day lodges with fantastic views from the top of Cleary Summit. During the winter, these lodges are open on the weekends for skiing, with a full kitchen, rental shop, and day use area. At night they are open for aurora viewing from October to April for $30 per person. During the spring, summer, and fall the lodges are closed. Year-round both lodges and the grounds may be rented for weddings or events.

Ski Land hosts a 3882' long Mueller Double Chair Lift, named Silver Star, that can bring guest up the mountain in approximately 10 minutes. The 360' Sun Kid Wonder Carpet, named Sunny Side, provides easy loading, unloading, and riding for beginners of all ages. A large new beginner area was made for the Sunny Side lift.

Fairbanks Alpine Ski Club conducts training and races on Ski Land. A Race Office is set up on the mountain near the Sunny Side lift.

Because of a strong inversion, Ski Land is typically much warmer during the winter than Fairbanks and the surrounding areas.

The area encourages year-round, non-motorized, non-commercial, recreation for locals and visitors on its trail system.

References

External links
 

1962 establishments in Alaska
Buildings and structures in Fairbanks North Star Borough, Alaska
Roadside attractions in Alaska
Ski areas and resorts in Alaska
Tourist attractions in Fairbanks North Star Borough, Alaska